San Isidore is a rural suburb located on the outskirts of the city  of Wagga Wagga, New South Wales, Australia.

References

External links 

Suburbs of Wagga Wagga